Keith Berry may refer to:

 Keith Berry (musician) (born 1973), English musician and composer
 Keith Berry (fighter) (born 1987), American mixed martial artist

See also
 Keith Barry (born 1976), Irish illusionist